The 11th congressional district of Missouri was a congressional district for the United States House of Representatives in Missouri from 1873 to 1963.

List of members representing the district

References

 Congressional Biographical Directory of the United States 1774–present

Former congressional districts of the United States
11
Constituencies established in 1873
1873 establishments in Missouri
Constituencies disestablished in 1933
1933 disestablishments in Missouri
Constituencies established in 1935
1935 establishments in Missouri
Constituencies disestablished in 1963
1963 disestablishments in Missouri